Sam Page is an American physician and politician serving as the County Executive of St. Louis County, Missouri since April 29, 2019, taking office following the resignation of his predecessor, Steve Stenger. A member of the Democratic Party, Page represented the 2nd district of the St. Louis County Council from 2014 to 2019.

Political career 
Page was first elected to the Creve Coeur City Council in 1999, and re-elected in 2001.  In 2002, he was elected to the first of three terms in the Missouri House of Representatives.

On June 5, 2007, he announced his candidacy for the Democratic nomination for Lieutenant Governor of Missouri.  After a close race, his opponent Peter Kinder was re-elected on November 4, 2008.  In 2009, Dr. Page announced his candidacy for the Missouri State Senate in the 24th District.  Dr. Page ultimately lost the primary race.

In 2014, St. Louis County Councilwoman, Kathleen Kelly Burkett died midterm. Dr. Page was elected to fulfill her term in a special election held on August 5, 2014. On November 8, 2016 Councilman Page was re-elected for a four-year term commencing January 1, 2017.  On January 3, 2017 Council Member Page was elected Chair of the Council for 2017. He is also Chair of the Council's Committee of the Whole.

Electoral history

Personal life 
Dr. Page lives in Creve Coeur with his wife, Dr. Jennifer Page, and their three children who attend the local public schools.

References

External links 
 St. Louis County Council - Sam Page
 Missouri House of Representatives – Sam Page
 Campaign Website

1965 births
County commissioners in Missouri
County executives of St. Louis County, Missouri
Living people
Democratic Party members of the Missouri House of Representatives
Missouri city council members
People from Carter County, Missouri
Physicians from Missouri
University of Missouri–Kansas City alumni